A vehicle breakdown is a mechanical or electrical failure of a motor vehicle in such a way that the underlying problem prevents the vehicle from being operated or impedes the vehicle's operation so significantly that it is very difficult, nearly impossible, or else dangerous to operate.  

Vehicle breakdowns have various causes. Depending on the severity, the vehicle may need to be towed to an automobile repair shop or fixed on-site by roadside assistance or a mobile mechanic. With other problems, the driver may be able to operate the vehicle seemingly normally for some time, but the vehicle will need an eventual repair. Many vehicle owners with personal economic difficulty or a busy schedule may wait longer than they should to get necessary maintenance or repairs made to their vehicles, thereby increasing their chances of a breakdown, inducing further damage to the vehicle, or else causing more danger.

Severity
There are various levels of a vehicle's disability:

Total Breakdown

 A total breakdown is when the vehicle becomes totally immobile and cannot be driven even a short distance, thereby necessitating a tow to an auto mechanic, or an on-site repair from roadside assistance or a mobile technician.

Partial Breakdown

 In a partial breakdown, the vehicle may still be operable, but its operation may become more limited or more dangerous, or else its continued operation may contribute to further damage to the vehicle. When this occurs, it may be possible to drive the vehicle to a repair shop or a safer location for a mobile repair, thereby avoiding a tow.

Causes 
In 2014, The Royal Automobile Club (RAC) attended almost two million breakdowns in the United Kingdom. Battery problems were the most common cause of a car breakdown, accounting for more than 450,000 call-outs.

Top 10 Causes 
 Battery
 Wheel change
 Fuel
 Mechanical problems
 Puncture (no spare)
 Electrical problems
 Charging electric vehicles
 Clutch
 Ignition
 Cooling, heating, ventilation and air conditioning

Contributing Factors 
Roadside assistance data collected, analyzed and published by AAA provides the following statistical insights into vehicle breakdowns in the United States and Canada:

Age 

 Vehicles 10 years and older are twice as likely to end up immobilized on the side of the road compared to newer vehicles, and the odds of needing a tow quadruples.
 Vehicles fewer than five years old have a higher proportion of tire, key and fuel-related issues than older vehicles.
 One-in-five service calls for a newer vehicle required a tow to a repair facility.
 Vehicles between 6 and 10 years old have the highest proportion of battery-related issues, as most batteries have a three-to five-year life.

Maintenance 

 Millions of roadside breakdowns each year could be prevented with basic vehicle maintenance.
 35 percent of Americans have skipped or delayed service or repairs that were recommended by a mechanic or specified by the factory maintenance schedule.

Region 

 Drivers in the West experienced the most breakdowns, followed by the South, the Northeast and the Midwest.

Season 

 Roadside assistance calls peak in the summer (8.3 million) followed by winter (8.1 million), fall (7.8 million) and spring (7.7 million).

Coverage 
When a breakdown occurs, the motorist may be able to have the tow and/or repair covered by a third party:

Factory Warranty 

 A vehicle manufacturer's warranty often covers the repair and subsequent towing expense if the root cause of the repair is deemed warrantable and is repaired at a certified dealership.

Extended Warranty/Service Contract 

 A service contract is a type of extended warranty (although may not be legally considered a true warranty) that is typically available for purchase at the time of the vehicle sale and usually includes roadside assistance.

Insurance 

 An auto insurance policy provides liability coverage for any damage caused by a vehicle, however, some comprehensive policies also cover repairs, roadside assistance services, tow and rental expenses.

Roadside Assistance 

 A roadside assistance plan may be available for purchase through club membership or in some cases, as an add-on service from another subscription, such as a mobile phone.

See also
 Automobile repair shop
 Mobile mechanic
 Roadside assistance
 Tow truck
 Car insurance
 Car warranty
 Extended warranty

References

External links

Motor vehicle maintenance
de:Betriebsstörung#Stra.C3.9Fenverkehr